The following Union Army units and commanders fought in the Meridian campaign (3 February – 6 March 1864) of the American Civil War. Order of battle was compiled from the army organization during the campaign. The strength numbers listed in the tables are "present for duty".

Abbreviations used

Military rank
 MG = Major General
 BG = Brigadier General
 Col = Colonel
 Ltc = Lieutenant Colonel
 Maj = Major
 Cpt = Captain
 Lt  = Lieutenant

Other
 w = wounded
 mw = mortally wounded
 k = killed

Meridian Expedition
MG William Tecumseh Sherman
 Escort: 4th Illinois Cavalry Regiment, Company A: Lt Samuel A. Lowe

XVI Corps
MG Stephen A. Hurlbut

XVII Corps
MG James B. McPherson
 Escort: 4th Illinois Cavalry Regiment, Companies B, C and D: Cpt Garrett L. Collins
 Escort: 4th Independent Company Ohio Cavalry: Cpt John S. Foster

Smith's Column
BG William Sooy Smith

Yazoo Expedition
Col James Henry Coates

Notes

Citations

References

 
 

American Civil War orders of battle